In mathematics, Hilbert's syzygy theorem is one of the three fundamental theorems about polynomial rings over fields, first proved by David Hilbert in 1890, which were introduced for solving important open questions in invariant theory, and are at the basis of modern algebraic geometry. The two other theorems are Hilbert's basis theorem that asserts that all ideals of polynomial rings over a field are finitely generated, and Hilbert's Nullstellensatz, which establishes a bijective correspondence between affine algebraic varieties and prime ideals of polynomial rings.

Hilbert's syzygy theorem concerns the relations, or  syzygies in Hilbert's terminology, between the generators of an ideal, or, more generally, a module. As the relations form a module, one may consider the relations between the relations; the theorem asserts that, if one continues in this way, starting with a module over a polynomial ring in  indeterminates over a field, one eventually finds a zero module of relations, after at most  steps.

Hilbert's syzygy theorem is now considered to be an early result of homological algebra. It is the starting point of the use of homological methods in commutative algebra and algebraic geometry.

History
The syzygy theorem first appeared in Hilbert's seminal paper "Über die Theorie der algebraischen Formen" (1890). The paper is split into five parts: part I proves Hilbert's basis theorem over a field, while part II proves it over the integers. Part III contains the syzygy theorem (Theorem III), which is used in part IV to discuss the Hilbert polynomial. The last part, part V, proves finite generation of certain rings of invariants. Incidentally part III also contains a special case of the Hilbert–Burch theorem.

Syzygies (relations)

Originally, Hilbert defined syzygies for ideals in polynomial rings, but the concept generalizes trivially to (left) modules over any ring.

Given a generating set  of a module  over a ring , a relation or first syzygy between the generators is a -tuple  of elements of  such that

Let  be a free module with basis  The -tuple  may be identified with the element 

and the relations form the kernel  of the linear map  defined by  In other words, one has an exact sequence

This first syzygy module  depends on the choice of a generating set, but, if  is the module which is obtained with another generating set, there exist two free modules  and  such that 

where  denote the direct sum of modules.

The second syzygy module is the module of the relations between generators of the first syzygy module. By continuing in this way, one may define the th syzygy module for every positive integer .

If one does not take a basis as a generating set, then all subsequent syzygy modules are free.

Let  be the smallest integer, if any, such that the th syzygy module of a module  is free or projective. The above property of invariance, up to the sum direct with free modules, implies that  does not depend on the choice of generating sets. This is equivalent with the existence of an exact sequence

It can be shown that one may always choose the generating sets for  being free, that is for the above exact sequence to be a free resolution.

Statement 

of length .

This upper bound on the projective dimension is sharp, that is, there are modules of projective dimension exactly . The standard example is the field , which may be considered as a -module by setting  for every  and every . For this module, the th syzygy module is free, but not the th one (for a proof, see , below).

The theorem is also true for modules that are not finitely generated.

Low dimension 

In the case of zero indeterminates, Hilbert's syzygy theorem is simply the fact that every vector space has a basis.

In the case of a single indeterminate, Hilbert's syzygy theorem is an instance of the theorem asserting that over a principal ideal ring, every submodule of a free module is itself free.

Koszul complex 

The Koszul complex, also called "complex of exterior algebra", allows, in some cases, an explicit description of all syzygy modules.

where  is the free module, which has, as a basis, the exterior products

For every positive , one may define a linear map  by

where the hat means that the factor is omitted. A straightforward computation shows that the composition of two consecutive such maps is zero, and thus that one has a complex

This is the Koszul complex. In general the Koszul complex is not an exact sequence, but it is an exact sequence if one works with a polynomial ring  and an ideal generated by a regular sequence of homogeneous polynomials.

Computation
At Hilbert's time, there were no method available for computing syzygies. It was only known that an algorithm may be deduced from any upper bound of the degree of the generators of the module of syzygies. In fact, the coefficients of the syzygies are unknown polynomials. If the degree of these polynomials is bounded, the number of their monomials is also bounded.  Expressing that one has a syzygy provides a system of linear equations whose unknowns are the coefficients of these monomials. Therefore, any algorithm for linear systems implies an algorithm for syzygies, as soon as a bound of the degrees is known.

On the other hand, there are examples where a double exponential degree necessarily occurs. However such examples are extremely rare, and this sets the question of an algorithm that is efficient when the output is not too large. At the present time, the best algorithms for computing syzygies are Gröbner basis algorithms. They allow the computation of the first syzygy module, and also, with almost no extra cost, all syzygies modules.

Syzygies and regularity
One might wonder which ring-theoretic property of  causes the Hilbert syzygy theorem to hold. It turns out that 
this is regularity, which is an algebraic formulation of the fact that affine -space is a variety without singularities. In fact the following generalization holds: Let  be a Noetherian ring. This result may be proven using Serre's theorem on regular local rings.

See also 
 Quillen–Suslin theorem
 Hilbert series and Hilbert polynomial

References 

 David Eisenbud, Commutative algebra. With a view toward algebraic geometry. Graduate Texts in Mathematics, 150. Springer-Verlag, New York, 1995. xvi+785 pp. ;  
 

Commutative algebra
Homological algebra
Invariant theory
Theorems in ring theory